Carlos Medina (born 1953 in Barquisimeto) is a Venezuelan visual artist. His work has been shown in Italy, France, Belgium, Yugoslavia, United States, South Korea, Austria, Hungary, Spain, Mexico, Chile, Argentina, Colombia, Panama, Costa Rica and Venezuela.

Most of Venezuelan national museums present permanent exhibits including Caracas' Museo de Bellas Artes (Fine Arts Museum) and Museo de Arte Contemporáneo (Caracas Contemporary Art Museum). Carlos Medina currently works in Caracas and Paris.

Carlos Medina is known for his minimalist geometric compositions and large spatial interventions in combination with sculpture techniques and plastic arts.

Education 
Carlos Medina was born in 1953 in Barquisimeto, Venezuela. After finishing his art studies in 1975 in the Escuela de Artes Plásticas Cristóbal Rojas de Caracas (School of Plastic Arts Cristobal Rojas), he produced his first large exposition in the Museo de Arte Contemporáneo where he presented geometric works in iron assembly carved from Cumarebo limestone.

In 1977, he was granted the fellowships by the Italian government and FUNDARTE (Fundación para la Cultura y las Artes). He spent seven years in Italy developing professional skills in carving, lathing, and 3D modeling by participating in workshops with Carlo Andrei from Gonari Marmi in the industry, crafting bronze sculptures in Pietrasanta Fonderia Artistica Mariani and attending courses in the Accademia di Belle Arti di Carrara. He received the 1975 Sculpture Prize in the 4th National Salon of Young Artists organized by the National Institute of Culture and Fine Arts (INCIBA) at Caracas, the Carrara City Honors in 1978 and the Critical Art Association Award (AICA), Venezuela in 1984.

During his training, Carlos Medina studied graphical techniques in the Frans Masereel Centrum in Belgium and frequents different workshops of sculptors like Sérgio de Camargo, Giò Pomodoro, Alicia Penalba and Gonzalo Fonseca.

Work 
In 1984 he returned to Caracas where he presents the exhibition Esculturas, a series of more than 30 sculptures in granite, marble and travertine, with the addition of around 30 engravings and drawings using black and gold India ink. This exposition has been presented in the Museo de Bellas Artes and the Museo de Arte Contemporáneo in Caracas, as well as in the main arts museums of other cities like Barquisimeto, Porlamar and Maracay.

Later he developed relationships with notable masters of Venezuelan art like Alejandro Otero, Jesús Rafael Soto and Carlos Cruz-Diez, who through their exchanges influence his intervention of space.

In the following decades he developed more than twenty large scale sculptures: Fragmentos de lluvia (Rain fragments) is a recurrent project that dates from 1989 and culminates in 2014 with a large scale replica as gift to the city of Caracas. It consist of seven metallic droplets of 6 meters high, now in open air by the side of the Francisco de Miranda Freeway, one of the main routes of the capital. The works of Carlos Medina also integrates the public domain including Caracas Metro, SIDOR, and a variety of public squares and commercial centers in the national territory.

From 2012 he started the Essentials concept in the MUSA (Museo de las Artes de Guadalajara), Mexico. The exposition has been presented in Panama City and Miami. It covers a series of delicate almost-geometrical structures constructed with the use of different techniques of blacksmith’s workshop, carpentry, laser cutting and refinery of PVC sheets.  Recurrent themes are based on abstract depiction of tears/droplets, surfaces and neutrinos (spherical atoms) suspended in three dimensional spaces. ArtNexus summarizes his work as: the possi-bility of expressing through matter that which transcends the matter itself, the very essence of objects manifested only in the presence of objects.

Carlos Medina has won numerous awards and distinctions. In 1993 he won the grand prize of Salón Michelena LI edition and the Sculptor Prize in Argentina, in addition to the Honorific Mention in the I Biennale of Guadalajara (2008) and the 2014 Sculpture Prize from Venezuelan Association of Plastic Artists (AVAP) .

Exhibitions 
Some of his exhibitions include:

Individual exhibitions 
 2016 Imperceptible, Ascaso Art Gallery, Caracas, Venezuela Essential, Ascaso Gallery, Miami, USA
 2015 Esencial. Marion Gallery, Panama City. Panama.
 2013 Esencial, Museum of Contemporary Art (MACZUL), Maracaibo, Venezuela.
 2013 Esencial, Museum of Contemporary Art, Yucatán (MACAY), Mérida, Mexico.
 2012 Esencial, Museum of Art Guadalajara University (MUSA), Mexico.
 2011 White Surfaces, Art Nouveau Gallery, Miami, USA
 2006 Papeles. Museum of Contemporary Art, Caracas, Venezuela
 2003 Carlos Medina y su obra, Museum of  Maya Culture, Chetumal, Mexico.
 1990 Obra en Madera, Museum of Contemporary Art, Caracas.
 1987 Mármoles, Museum of Modern Art Jesús Soto, Ciudad Bolívar, Venezuela.
 1984 Carlos Medina Esculturas, Fine Arts Museum, Caracas, Venezuela
 1979 Mármoles y Granitos, Van Vlaenderens Gallery & Luka Gallery, Belgium
 1975 Abstracciones geométricas espaciales, Museum of Contemporary Art, Caracas

Collective Exhibitions (selection) 
 2016  Art Elysées Fair, Espace Meyer-Zafra. París, France
 2015  Veintiuno XXI. La plástica del siglo XXI, MUSA Collection, Guadalajara Mexico.
 2012 I Muestra Internacional Escultura en Acero, Villacero Foundation, Monterrey, Mexico
 2012 Narrativas Contemporáneas, Andean Development Corporation (CAF), Caracas, Venezuela
 2007 Escultura Latinoamericana en Acero, Museum of Modern Art, Cartagena, Colombia
 2005 Arte Venezolano del Siglo XXI, Fine Arts Museum, Caracas
 2002 Abstracción y Geometría en la Colección, Museum of Contemporary Art of Caracas
 1998 Exposición Internacional de Escultura, Mala Espina Palace, Zacatecas, México
 1996 Esculturas Pequeño Formato, Municipal Hall, Alajuela, Costa Rica
 1996 Esculturas Pequeño Formato, Art room of the town Hall, Valdivia, Chile
 1984 Cien Obras de la Colección, Museum of Contemporary Art, Caracas
 1980 Sculptures in the Royal Villa, Ostende, Belgium
 1980  International sculpture in marble, Apple Gallery, Waregen/ De Zwarte Panter Gallery
 1980  Amberes /Maeyaert Gallery, Ostende. Belgium
 1981 Procurement Ministry of Culture of Belgium, traveling exhibition through several  national museums, Belgium

See also 

 Contemporary art
 Visual arts
 List of Venezuelan artists
 Venezuelan art
 Spanish art
 Art of South America

References 

Venezuelan artists
Minimalist artists
Venezuelan sculptors
Male sculptors
1953 births
People from Barquisimeto
Living people